The following lists events that happened during 1943 in New Zealand.

Population
 Estimated population as of 31 December: 1,642,000
 Increase since 31 December 1942: 5600 (0.34%)
 Males per 100 females: 92.9

Incumbents

Regal and viceregal
Head of State – George VI
Governor-General – Marshal of the Royal Air Force Sir Cyril Newall GCB OM GCMG CBE AM

Government
The 26th New Zealand Parliament concluded, with the Labour Party in government. Labour was re-elected for a third term in the election in November

Speaker of the House – Bill Barnard (Democratic Labour Party)
Prime Minister – Peter Fraser
Minister of Finance – Walter Nash
Minister of Foreign Affairs – Peter Fraser
Attorney-General – Rex Mason
Chief Justice – Sir Michael Myers

Parliamentary opposition 
 Leader of the Opposition –  Sidney Holland (National Party).

Main centre leaders
Mayor of Auckland – John Allum
Mayor of Hamilton – Harold Caro
Mayor of Wellington – Thomas Hislop
Mayor of Christchurch – Ernest Andrews
Mayor of Dunedin – Andrew Allen

Events 

 New Zealand troops take part in invasion of Italy.
25 February – Mutiny by Japanese prisoners of war at Featherston prisoner of war camp results in 48 Japanese dead, 61 wounded, plus one dead and 11 injured guards.
 28 March - Body of Michael Joseph Savage reinterred at Bastion Point by a crowd of ten thousand
 3 April – Battle of Manners Street between American and New Zealand servicemen
 4 June – Hyde railway disaster – 21 passengers are killed when the Cromwell to Dunedin Express derails while travelling around a bend too fast near Hyde in Central Otago.
 20 June – Several U.S. Marines drown during landing exercises at Paekākāriki.
 28 August – Eleanor Roosevelt arrives in New Zealand for visit (she had visited American troops in the Cook Islands).
 3 September – Eleanor Roosevelt flies out from Auckland.
 25 September – 1943 New Zealand general election.
 October last US Marines depart US Naval Base New Zealand
 Japanese submarines operate in New Zealand waters in 1942 and 1943. They send reconnaissance aircraft over Auckland and Wellington, but do not carry out any attacks.

Arts and literature

See 1943 in art, 1943 in literature

Music

See: 1943 in music

Radio

See: Public broadcasting in New Zealand

Film

See: :Category:1943 film awards, 1943 in film, List of New Zealand feature films, Cinema of New Zealand, :Category:1943 films

Sport

Archery
The New Zealand Archery Association, now Archery New Zealand, is incorporated.

The first national championships are held. From now until 1947 the championships are a postal shoot.
Men Open: W. Burton (Gisborne)

Cricket

Horse racing

Harness racing
 New Zealand Trotting Cup: Haughty – 2nd win
 Auckland Trotting Cup: Shadow Maid

Thoroughbred racing

Rugby union
:Category:Rugby union in New Zealand, :Category:All Blacks
 Ranfurly Shield

Soccer
 Chatham Cup competition not held
 Provincial league champions:
	Auckland:	Metro College
	Canterbury:	Western
	Hawke's Bay:	Napier HSOB
	Nelson:	No competition
	Otago:	Mosgiel
	South Canterbury:	No competition
	Southland:	No competition
	Taranaki:	RNZAF
	Waikato:	No competition
	Wanganui:	No competition
	Wellington:	Waterside

Births
 28 January: Malvina Major, opera singer
 10 March: John McGrath, judge (died 2018)
 16 March: Dave McKenzie, long-distance runner
 24 March: Kate Webb, journalist (died 2007) 
 6 April: Roger Cook, journalist
 7 May: Gretchen Albrecht, painter
 12 July: Bruce Taylor, cricketer (died 2021)
 16 July: Peter Welsh, steeplechase runner
 20 July: Chris Amon, Formula 1 racing driver (died 2016) 
 19 August: Sid Going, rugby union player
 9 September: Keith Murdoch, rugby union player (died 2018) 
 11 September: Brian Perkins, radio broadcaster in Britain (BBC) 
 15 October (in Bosnia): Drago Došen, painter (died 2019) 
 21 October: John Robertson (composer)
 27 October: Tom Lister, rugby union player (died 2017) 
 7 November: Silvia Cartwright, judge
 16 November: Chris Laidlaw, All Black, diplomat, politician and radio host
 24 November: Barry Milburn, cricketer
 26 November: Adrienne Simpson, broadcaster, historian, musicologist and writer (died 2010)
 17 December: (in Ireland): Bert Hawthorne, motor racing driver (died 1972) 
 25 December: Hedley Howarth, cricketer (died 2008)
 Mel Courtney, politician
 Brian Easton, economist
 Richard (Dick) Frizzell, artist
 Alamein Kopu, politician (died 2011)
 Georgina te Heuheu, politician

Deaths
 15 January: William Barber, politician.
 1 February: Frank Worsley, sailor and explorer.
 6 April: Paraire Karaka Paikea, politician.
 27 March: Moana-Nui-a-Kiwa Ngarimu, soldier, VC winner.
 22 May: Alfred Ransom, politician & cabinet minister.
 27 May: Gordon Coates, 21st Prime Minister of New Zealand.
 21 August: Hilda Hewlett, aviation pioneer.
 6 September: James Cowan, writer, historian and ethnographer.
 24 September: Arthur Withy, journalist and politician. 
 11 October: Matthew Joseph Brodie, second Catholic bishop of Christchurch.
 20 October: John Rigg, politician.
:Category:1943 deaths

See also
History of New Zealand
List of years in New Zealand
Military history of New Zealand
Timeline of New Zealand history
Timeline of New Zealand's links with Antarctica
Timeline of the New Zealand environment

For world events and topics in 1943 not specifically related to New Zealand see: 1943

References

External links

 
Years of the 20th century in New Zealand